The Jules Verne's Tomb is a grave memorial in Amiens, France La Madeleine Cemetery. It marks the grave of the 19th century writer Jules Verne. The sculpture was designed by Albert Roze and it depicts a man breaking out of his grave and reaching skyward. Verne died March 24, 1905 and the sculpture was added to the gravesite in 1907.

Background

In 1905 Jules Verne died in Amiens France, from chronic diabetes and complications from a stroke which paralyzed his right side. and 2 years later his tomb featured a dramatic sculpture of a man pushing his way out of the earth reaching to the heavens. The sculpture is entitled "Vers l’immortalité et l’éternelle jeunesse" (“towards immortality and eternal youth”). It was announced in January 1907 sculptor Albert Roze would erect a monument at the Jules Verne gravesite. 

The grave's sculpture has become a tourist attraction. The city of Amiens also features the tomb on their tourist page.

See also
 Graves
 Monument
 Grave marker
 Tomb

References

Notes

External links
Amiens tourist page

Monuments and memorials in France
Outdoor sculptures in France
Statues in France
Tombs in France
20th-century sculptures
Jules Verne